Nils Doergelo (born Nils Dörgeloh; December 25, 1979) is a German actor.

Life 
Nils Doergelo has trained at the Schule für Schauspiel Hamburg and at the William Esper Studio in New York City. He later studied at the Michael Chekhov Acting Studio in Berlin. He also took acting lessons in Los Angeles.

In 2013, Nils Doergelo made his movie debut in Marco Kreuzpaintner’s comedy Coming In, alongside Kostja Ullmann and Aylin Tezel.

Since 2017 Nils Doergelo is a series regular in the comedy series Jerks alongside Christian Ulmen and Fahri Yardim.

He received the Quotenmeter Fernsehpreis as Best supporting actor for his portrayal of Jacob. 
Since January 2017 the series can be streamed on maxdome. In February 2017 it was broadcast on ProSieben.

Currently Nils Doergelo is involved in the SWR series Labaule und Erben, which will be shot until mid-December 2017. The story is based on an idea by Harald Schmidt and the script is written by Richard Kropf, Bob Konrad and Hanno Hackford, the authors of 4 Blocks.  Nils Doergelo is working on the project together with actor Uwe Ochsenknecht and director Boris Kunz (Hindafing).

In October 2017 Nils Doergelo shot his second episode of the popular German crime series Tatort in Bremen. In the episode “Im toten Winkel” by director Philip Koch he will be seen in a main role. Furthermore he completed filming the ARD comedy Opa wird Papa, Der Mordanschlag, a TV movie in two parts by director Miguel Alexandre and one episode of the RTL comedy series Jenny - echt gerecht.
The Tatort  Die dunkle Zeit (director: Niki Stein), on which Nils Doergelo worked together with Wotan Wilke Möhring premiered at Filmfest Hamburg 2017. The TV movie will air on December 17, 2017 on ARD. In 2018, Doergelo played a leading role in the new television series Milk & Honey.

Nils Doergelo lives in Berlin.

Filmography 
 2013: Coming In (Cinema)
 2014: SOKO Wismar – Tödliche Nebenwirkungen
 2014: 600 PS für zwei (TV movie)
 2015: Kommissar Marthaler – Ein allzu schönes Mädchen (TV movie)
 2015:  (Cinema)
 2015: Große Fische, kleine Fische (TV movie)
 Since 2017: Jerks (TV series)
 2017: Tatort – Die dunkle Zeit (TV movie)
 2017: Die Kanzlei – Absturz
 2017: Familie Dr. Kleist – Freunde oder mehr
 2017: Notruf Hafenkante – Entführt
 2017: Tatort – Im toten Winkel (TV movie)
 2017: Opa wird Papa (TV movie)
 2017: SOKO Hamburg – Junggesellenabschied
 2017: Jenny – echt gerecht – Fahrerflucht
 2017: Ihr seid natürlich eingeladen (TV movie)
 2017: Der Mordanschlag (TV movie)
 2018: Milk & Honey (TV series, 10 episodes)
 2018: Labaule & Erben (Miniseries, 6 episodes)
 2019: Camping mit Herz (TV movie)
 2020: Die Känguru-Chroniken (Cinema)
 2021: Next Door (Cinema)

References

External links 
 Nils Doergelo at the Internet Movie Database
 Nils Doergelo at Agentur Gold Berlin
 www.nilsdoergelo.com

German male film actors
1979 births
Living people
Male actors from Berlin
21st-century German male actors